Papyrus 108 (in the Gregory-Aland numbering), designated by 𝔓108, is a copy of the New Testament in Greek. It is a papyrus manuscript of the Gospel of John, containing verses 17:23-24 (the end of the Farewell Discourse) and 18:1-5 in a fragmentary condition. The manuscript has been paleographically assigned to the late 2nd or early 3rd Century CE.
The manuscript is currently housed at the Papyrology Rooms (P. Oxy. 4447) of the Sackler Library at Oxford University.

Description
The original manuscript would've been around 14.5 cm x 18.5 cm, with 23 lines per page. The handwriting script is representative of the reformed Documentary style. The text is a representative of the Alexandrian text-type. Although small, the manuscript concurs with Codex Sinaiticus. It has itacistic error in John 17:23 (γεινωσκη instead of γινωσκη).

Textual Variants
John 17:24 (1)
δεδωκας :     B C D
εδωκας : A

John 17:24 (2)
κακεινοι :     B C D 
και εκεινοι : A

John 17:24 (3)
εδωκας :  B K N Γ Θ 209 al; Cl
δεδωκας :  A C D

John 18:2 (1)
 (ιησους) :      B L pc
 ο  (ιησους) : A C D W Θ Ψ 0250 ƒ 33 
και ο  (ιησους) : Γ Δ 892 al

John 18:2 (2)
εκει μετα των μαθητων αυτου :    A C D W 
μετα των μαθητων αυτου εκει : B
εκει μετα των μαθητων : *

John 18:3
και φαρισαιων :   A C W Θ Ψ 0250 ƒ 33 
και εκ των φαρισαιων : * D L 579 pc a aur
και των φαρισαιων : B 0140 

John 18:4 (1)
δε :   D L W f 33 565 pc it sy co
ουν :  A B C Θ Ψ 0250  aurc e vg syh

John 18:4 (2)
ειδως :   L W ƒ 
ιδως : A C
ειδων : D

John 18:4 (3)
εξελθων ειπεν :   A C L W Θ Ψ 0250 ƒ 33 
εξηλθεν και λεγει : B C* D ƒ 565 pc lat
εξηλθεν εξω και λεγει :

See also 

 List of New Testament papyri
 Oxyrhynchus Papyri
 Gospel of John: chapter 17, 18

References

Further reading 

 W. E. H. Cockle, The Oxyrhynchus Papyri LXV (London: 1998), pp. 16–18.

External links

Images 
 P.Oxy.LXIV 4447 from Papyrology at Oxford's "POxy: Oxyrhynchus Online" 
 Image from 𝔓108 recto, John 17:23-24 
 Image from 𝔓108 verso, John 18:1-5

Official registration 
 "Continuation of the Manuscript List" Institute for New Testament Textual Research, University of Münster. Retrieved April 9, 2008

New Testament papyri
3rd-century biblical manuscripts
Early Greek manuscripts of the New Testament
Gospel of John papyri